Heislerville is an unincorporated community and census-designated place (CDP) that is part of Maurice River Township in Cumberland County in the U.S. state of New Jersey. It was named after the Heisler family, prominent members of the Methodist Episcopal Church established here in 1828.

The community borders the Maurice River and Delaware Bay; bayshore areas are East Point and Thompson's Beach, now flooded by the state of New Jersey for use as a bird watch conservatory. The East Point Lighthouse was built in 1849, located on the northern side of Delaware Bay at the mouth of the circuitous Maurice River. The lighthouse is a restful place to fish or hike and is open a few days every year. It is still a working light house but is only operated remotely, having not been staffed for years. It was added to the National Register of Historic Places in 1995 for its significance in engineering, maritime history, and transportation.

Today, aside from truck gardens, small fishing operations, and a couple of marinas on state-leased land off Matt's Landing Road; the town has no shops or businesses. The major employer of townspeople is the state of New Jersey as Maurice River Township is home to three prisons; Bayside, South Woods, and Southern State. In addition to the Heislerville United Methodist Church, located within the community is the Heislerville Volunteer Fire Company.

Demographics

Heislerville's population as of the 2020 United States census was 227, while the 2010 census showed a count of 451.

Gallery

References

External links
 
 

Maurice River Township, New Jersey
Census-designated places in Cumberland County, New Jersey
Unincorporated communities in Cumberland County, New Jersey
Unincorporated communities in New Jersey
Historic American Buildings Survey in New Jersey